A tropical depression is a tropical cyclone that reaches maximum sustained winds below . The Japan Meteorological Agency (JMA) is the main weather forecasting agency in the Pacific Northwest Pacific basin, where it measures sustained winds by averaging wind speeds in a period of ten minutes. The basin is limited to the north of the equator between the 100th meridian east and the 180th meridian.

Background

The Northwest Pacific basin covers a vast area in the Pacific Ocean, located north of the equator, between 100°E and 180°E. Several weather agencies monitor this basin, however it is officially monitored by the Japan Meteorological Agency (JMA, RSMC Tokyo), who is responsible for forecasting, naming and issuing warnings for tropical cyclones. Unofficially, the Joint Typhoon Warning Center also monitors the basin, however these warnings measures 1-minute sustained wind speeds, comparing their scale to the Saffir–Simpson scale. The JMA uses a simpler scale on classifying tropical cyclones adapted by the ESCAP/WMO Typhoon Committee measuring 10-minute sustained wind speeds, ranging from a tropical depression, tropical storm, severe tropical storm and typhoon. Furthermore, the JMA divides the typhoon category into three sub-categories for domestic purposes – a strong typhoon, very strong typhoon and violent typhoon.

This article covers a list of systems developing in the Northwest Pacific basin that were classified by the category of a tropical depression by the JMA, JTWC and PAGASA. The category of a tropical depression ranges with sustained winds of below 34 knots (63 km/h; 39 mph). Just to note that this article only lists tropical depressions that were named, designated and systems that affected any land masses.

Systems

1980s

1990s

2000s

2010s

2020s

See also

 Typhoon
 Pacific typhoon season
  Pacific typhoon season

References

External links
 Japan Meteorological Agency

Tropical depressions
WPAC TD